The 2008–09 Moldovan National Division was the 18th season of top-tier football in Moldova. The season started on 2 July 2008 and ended on 17 May 2009.

Just prior to the start of the season, FC Politehnica Chișinău withdrew from the competition, causing the league to play with 11 teams this year. Further, CSCA-Steaua Chișinău merged with Rapid Ghidighici. The new club play under the name CSCA-Rapid Chișinău.

Clubs

Promotion and relegation
Due to the withdrawal of FC Rapid Ghidighici in mid-November 2007, no teams were relegated to Moldovan "A" Division. Promoted to Moldova's top-tier football were FC Academia UTM Chișinău.

League table

Results
The schedule consists of three rounds. During the first two rounds, each team played each other once home and away for a total of 20 matches. The pairings of the third round were then set according to the standings after the first two rounds, giving every team a third game against each opponent for a total of 30 games per team.

First and second round

Third round

Key numbers for pairing determination:

Top goalscorers

References

External links
Moldova - List of final tables (RSSSF)
 Divizia Națională 2008-2009 at soccerway
 Arhiva campionatelor Moldovei - FMF.md
 Divizia Națională 2008-2009 at betexplorer

Moldovan Super Liga seasons
1
Moldova